Jacques Coetzee (born 22 October 1984) is a South African rugby union player.

He played for them for four seasons, during which time he also represented the Royal XV in a game during the 2009 British & Irish Lions tour to South Africa. The following season, he was included in the 2010 Super 14 squad for the Lions.

References

South African rugby union players
Living people
1984 births
Rugby union scrum-halves
Lions (United Rugby Championship) players
Cheetahs (rugby union) players
Eastern Province Elephants players
Griquas (rugby union) players
Rugby union players from Mpumalanga